Grant Trindall is an Australian former professional rugby league footballer who played in the 1990s. He played for Penrith and Western Suburbs in the NSWRL/ARL competition.

Playing career
Trindall made his first grade debut for Penrith in round 9 of the 1993 NSWRL season against Western Suburbs at Campbelltown Sports Stadium. Trindall played at lock in Penrith's 24-10 loss. In 1995, Trindall joined Western Suburbs and played one game for the club, a 46-12 loss against the Auckland Warriors in round 3 of the competition at Mount Smart Stadium.

References

Year of birth missing (living people)
Western Suburbs Magpies players
Penrith Panthers players
Australian rugby league players
Rugby league locks
Living people